Vikash Kumar Munda is an Indian politician. Munda is a member of the Jharkhand Legislative Assembly from the Tamar constituency in Ranchi district. He is the son of former minister Ramesh Singh Munda.

References 

People from Ramgarh district
All Jharkhand Students Union politicians
Members of the Jharkhand Legislative Assembly
Living people
Munda people
Jharkhand MLAs 2009–2014
Year of birth missing (living people)
Jharkhand MLAs 2014–2019